In the theory of formal languages, the pumping lemma may refer to:
Pumping lemma for regular languages, the fact that all sufficiently long strings in such a language have a substring that can be repeated arbitrarily many times, usually used to prove that certain languages are not regular
Pumping lemma for context-free languages, the fact that all sufficiently long strings in such a language have a pair of substrings that can be repeated arbitrarily many times, usually used to prove that certain languages are not context-free
 Pumping lemma for indexed languages
 Pumping lemma for regular tree languages

See also
 Ogden's lemma, a stronger version of the pumping lemma for context-free languages